Nikolay Radev (born 17 July 1996) is a Bulgarian footballer who plays as a goalkeeper for Botev Ihtiman.

Career

Vitosha Bistritsa
On 29 August 2013 he joined Vitosha Bistritsa Academy from CSKA Sofia.  In January 2018, Radev was loaned to Oborishte but returned to his parent club in July.

Career statistics

Club

References

External links
 

Living people
1996 births
Footballers from Sofia
Bulgarian footballers
Association football goalkeepers
FC Vitosha Bistritsa players
FC Oborishte players
FC Sportist Svoge players
First Professional Football League (Bulgaria) players
Second Professional Football League (Bulgaria) players